Byron Browne (1907–1961) was an American painter and founding member of the American Abstract Artists.

Biography
Browne was born on June 26, 1907, in Yonkers, New York. He studied at the National Academy of Design from 1925 to 1928. He was a member of the Artists Union. In 1936 he was one of the founding members of the American Abstract Artists. He created murals under the auspices of the Works Progress Administration for the Chronic Disease Hospital and the 1939 New York World's Fair. In 1940 he married fellow artist Rosalind Bengelsdorf. He taught painting at the Art Students League of New York from 1948 through 1959 and went on to teach at New York University. He died on December 25, 1961, in New York City.

Browne's work is included in the collections of the Art Institute of Chicago, the Museum of Modern Art, the Philadelphia Museum of Art,  the Smithsonian American Art Museum, and the Whitney Museum of American Art.

References

External links
images of Browne's work from the Smithsonian American Art Museum

Further reading
 Rogers, Jim Byron Browne, A Seminal American Modernist: Paintings and Drawings, 1929 to 1961 

1907 births
1961 deaths 
20th-century American artists